Acetyl activating enzyme may refer to:

 Acetyl-CoA synthetase, an enzyme
 Long-chain-fatty-acid—CoA ligase, an enzyme